Adriaan Daniël Fokker (17 August 1887 – 24 September 1972) was a Dutch physicist. He worked in the fields of special relativity and statistical mechanics. He was the inventor of the Fokker organ, a 31-tone equal-tempered (31-TET) organ.

Life and work
Adriaan Daniël Fokker was born on 17 August 1887 in Buitenzorg, Dutch East Indies (now Bogor, Indonesia). He was a cousin of the aeronautical engineer Anthony Fokker.

Fokker studied mining engineering at the Delft University of Technology and physics at the University of Leiden with Hendrik Lorentz, where he earned his doctorate in 1913. He continued his studies with Albert Einstein, Ernest Rutherford and William Bragg. In his 1913 thesis, he derived the Fokker–Planck equation along with Max Planck. After his military service during World War I he returned to Leiden as Lorentz' and Ehrenfest's assistant. Fokker became a physics teacher at the Gymnasium of Delft after 1918 and was appointed in 1923 as the first professor of Applied Physics at the Technische Hoogeschool Delft (today Delft University of Technology). 
In 1928 Fokker succeeded Hendrik Lorentz as director of research at Teylers Museum in Haarlem.

Fokker made several contributions to special relativity, and some less well-known contributions to general relativity, particularly in the area of geodetic precession, the phenomena of precession of a freely falling gyroscope in a gravitational field.

Fokker began to study music theory during the Second World War, when the University of Leiden was closed; partly this was due to a desire to convince the Nazis he would be of no use to the war effort, and partly it was a response to reading the work of Christiaan Huygens on the 31 equal temperament.

In 1938, Fokker – along with Dirk Coster and Otto Hahn – helped Jewish-born physicist Lise Meitner escape from Austria to the Netherlands. "Fokker and Coster both knew that university positions were virtually unavailable for foreigners. Laboratory space was not a problem, however, either in Groningen or Haarlem. 'Perhaps we can tap colleagues for regular contributions,' Coster suggested. Fokker set a goal of f.20,000, enough to support Meitner for five years, and immediately began contacting colleagues for advice and donations." They were unsuccessful in obtaining funding, but Fokker succeeded in getting official permission for Meitner to leave, although he was unable to telegraph that to her due to secrecy. She escaped barely in time to evade arrest.

The year 1942 consequently marked a turning point in his life; after then he wrote many pieces in 31-equal, which are notable for using the 7th harmonic as a consonant interval (31-equal has a much better approximation of the 7th harmonic than the ubiquitous 12-equal). He also made notable contributions to music theory, such as the Fokker periodicity block.

In 1949 he became member of the Royal Netherlands Academy of Arts and Sciences.

He died on 24 September 1972, at the age of 85, in Beekbergen near Apeldoorn.

Musical instruments

Fokker designed and had built a number of keyboard instruments capable of playing microtonal scales via a generalized keyboard.  The best-known of these is his 31-tone equal-tempered organ, which was installed in Teyler's Museum in Haarlem in 1951.  It is commonly called the Fokker organ. The Fokker organ is currently property of the Huygens-Fokker Foundation and it moved to the Bamzaal in Muziekgebouw aan 't IJ. Regularly concerts take place on this instrument in the Bamzaal.

See also
 Action at a distance
 Archicembalo, another instrument that was sometimes tuned in 31TET.
 Born rigidity
 Euler–Fokker genus
 Geodetic effect
 Nordström's theory of gravitation
 Relativistic center of mass

References and notes

External links

 Oral history interview transcript with Adriaan Fokker on 1 April 1963, American Institute of Physics, Niels Bohr Library & Archives
 Adriaan Fokker and the Archiphone on '120 Years Of Electronic Music'
Short biography from the Huygens–Fokker Foundation
 H.A.M. Snelders, "Fokker, Adriaan Daniël (1887–1972)", in Biografisch Woordenboek van Nederland. [13-03-2008]

1887 births
1972 deaths
20th-century Dutch physicists
20th-century Dutch inventors
Microtonal musicians
Dutch music theorists
Delft University of Technology alumni
Leiden University alumni
People from Bogor
Musicians from West Java
Members of the Royal Netherlands Academy of Arts and Sciences
Members of Teylers Tweede Genootschap
20th-century musicologists
Dutch people of the Dutch East Indies